The Macedonian Ecological Society (MES) was founded in 1972 in what was then known as the Socialist Republic of Macedonia.

Principal tasks and goals

 Encourage the development of ecological scientific disciplines in North Macedonia
 Promote the improvement of ecological and environmental education in the Macedonian education system
 Raise public environmental awareness
 Draw attention to environmental problems and, using scientific arguments, stimulate public pressure on institutions and authorities to invest in environmental protection enterprises
 Provide expert assistance to the Macedonian Government in establishing legislative environmental policy
 Promote monitoring systems and follow-up for environment quality in North Macedonia
 Nature conservation with special emphasis on biodiversity

Principal activities in recent years 
 Complex ecological investigations in the beech forests in Mavrovo National Park 1997-2000
 Balkan Bear Carnivores Conservation Network (BALKAN NET) - (Led by Arcturos, Greece)
 TEDDY Project (Led by Arcturos, Greece)
 Symposium "Sustainable development of transboundary Prespa region," Prespa, 2000
 "Integrated Preservation of the Balkan Wolf Population by Diminishing the Human-Carnivore Conflict and Altering the Attitudes towards the Wolf", 2000.  MES partnered with the Bulgarian Wilderness Fund and the Albanian Society for the Protection of Birds and Mammals (ASPBM)
 ECO-NET: Creation of a network for legal protection and management of protected areas in the southern Balkans, in cooperation with Arcturos (Greece), Journalist Environmental Center - ERINA (North Macedonia) and NGOs from Bulgaria, Albania and Yugoslavia (Project in the frame of DAC) (unclear), 2001–2002
 "BEZFOS" - Use of phosphate-free detergents in the Lake Ohrid regions of Ohrid and Struga (led by Farmahem (Pharmachem, Skopje), 2003.
 Vulture conservation project, North Macedonia, 2003-
 Preparation of an Action Plan for sustainable development of the village of Galicnik, 2005
 Balkan Green belt as ecological corridor for the bear, wolf and lynx: Jablanica Mountain, 2005
 Balkan Lynx Recovery Programme - Macedonia – 2006

External links 
 Macedonian Ecological Society - website

Environmental organizations based in North Macedonia